David McRae (born 1980) is an American politician from Mississippi. He is the Mississippi State Treasurer.

McRae ran for Mississippi State Treasurer in the 2015 Mississippi elections, and lost in the Republican primary election to incumbent Lynn Fitch. When Fitch chose to run for Attorney General of Mississippi in the 2019 Mississippi elections. McRae ran for treasurer again. He defeated Eugene Clarke in the Republican primary, and then won the general election on November 5.

Mississippi Treasurer 
McRae was sworn-in as State Treasurer on January 9, 2020.

McRae has prioritized the distribution of unclaimed property within the Office of the State Treasurer, returning $20 million during his first year in office. McRae also oversees College Savings Mississippi, helping lift the financial burden of a college education for thousands of young people.

Despite the challenges of 2020, McRae proved to creditors that Mississippi could manage its money, and he successfully protected the state's strong double-A ratings – an accomplishment that has saved taxpayers more than $36 million.

Personal life 
McRae earned his Bachelor’s degree from Southern Methodist University and his J.D. degree from Mississippi College. He lives in Ridgeland, Mississippi with his wife, Katherine, and their three children. They attend Christ United Methodist Church in Jackson.

References

External links

1980 births
21st-century American politicians
Living people
Mississippi lawyers
Mississippi Republicans
People from Ridgeland, Mississippi
State treasurers of Mississippi